The Presidency of Mauricio Macri began on 10 December 2015, when Mauricio Macri was sworn into office on 10 December 2015 to a four-year term as President of Argentina. Macri took office following a 51.34% to 48.66% runoff ballotage win over Daniel Scioli in the 2015 general election. He is Argentina's first democratically elected non-Radical or Peronist president since 1916. In elections of October 2019, he lost his re-election bid for a second term and was succeeded by Alberto Fernández as president. Macri is also the first incumbent president in Argentina and South America's history to be unseated by a challenger and not reaching a second term.

President-elect
He has promised to reduce inflation, improve conditions for business, and cease the international alignment with Venezuela and Iran. Macri has announced an infrastructure development strategy named Plan Belgrano (after Manuel Belgrano), a plan aimed at building infrastructure and encouraging industry development in ten of Argentina's northern provinces, which have historically lagged behind the rest of the country in these areas. The plan includes a proposed investment of equivalent to 16 billion United States dollars over the course of 10 years, along with an "historical reconstruction fund" of 50 billion pesos to be used in 4 years. Other objectives of the plan include the provision of housing for some 250,000 families, and the construction of 1400 child care centers.

Macri announced the full composition of his cabinet on November 25, 2015, some two weeks before he was due to take office.

Inauguration

Macri took office on 10 December 2015. He began the ceremony starting from his apartment in the neighborhood of Recoleta at the corner of Avenida del Libertador and Cavia at 11:00pm to the National Congress of Argentina with his wife Juliana Awada and his youngest daughter of 4 years old, through the Casa Rosada and the Plaza de Mayo. At 11:41 he entered the room where the Legislature was, taking an oath after the Vice President Gabriela Michetti. Then he delivered a speech of 27 minutes in which he pledged his "support for an independent judiciary, fight corruption and drug trafficking, the internal union of Argentina, universal social protection, create a 21st-century style of education and that everyone can have a roof, water and sewer". Also greeted his competitors during the presidential elections.

Later he went to the Casa Rosada, where he received the presidential attributes in the White Hall of the hands of the Temporary President of the Senate, Federico Pinedo, accompanied by Vice President Gabriela Michetti, president of the Chamber of Deputies Emilio Monzó and President of the Supreme Court Ricardo Lorenzetti. Minutes later came the historic balcony where thousands of people waited in the Plaza de Mayo, expressing his hope that "the Argentines can live better, starting a wonderful time for our country, always telling the truth, being honest, showing the problems " and calling " the Argentines to accompany management and alerting when he mistake".

After being anointed President, he gave a reception at the San Martín Palace of Argentina Foreign Ministry to all the heads of state present: Michelle Bachelet from Chile, Horacio Cartes from Paraguay, Juan Manuel Santos from Colombia, Rafael Correa from Ecuador, Evo Morales from Bolivia, Dilma Rousseff from Brazil, and representatives of other countries attending his inauguration.

Cabinet

Ministries

Presidential secretariats

Domestic affairs

Economic policy 

One of the first changes to economic policy from the Macri administration, just seven days after he had taken office, was to remove the capital controls that had been in place for four consecutive years. The move signified a 30% devaluation of the peso, and was met with both criticism and praise.

The Macri's administration eliminated export taxes on agricultural products (wheat, corn, sunflower, meat and fish), minerals (metallic and non-metallic) and certain industrial products; while it promised to lower the tariff on soy 5% every year.

For the next year, he eliminated the Advance Affidavits of Importation (an import control program) and extended Careful Pricing (a price control program) for six months.

Since 2016, Macri began the removal of energy subsidies (for electricity, gas and water) and transport subsidies (for bus, train and subway), which caused a huge increase in prices. He avoided to use a shock therapy and introduced the changes gradually.

On January 19, Macri attended the World Economic Forum in Davos, Switzerland with Sergio Massa and part of his cabinet looking for investments. He had meetings with various business representatives, politicians and journalists. Some of them were US Vice President Joe Biden, the Prime Minister of the United Kingdom, David Cameron, the founder of Virgin Group Richard Branson, CEO of Google Eric Schmidt, the Queen of the Netherlands, President and CEO Coca-Cola, Muhtar Kent among others. It was the first time that Argentina participates since 2003. The last president was Eduardo Duhalde.

Macri wanted to negotiate with holdouts and end the default to return to the international capital markets. Argentina faced a court hearing in New York on April 13. The court upheld judge Thomas P. Griesa's ruling and allowed Argentina to pay the 2005 and 2010 bondholders. The payment, made with a bond sale, was the end of the Argentine default.

One of Macri's promises during the campaign was the elimination of Income tax for workers. Macri had not fulfilled his promise, and it was not in the government's plan to eliminate the Income tax in the future either.

Political intervention in the INDEC figures ended, and the IMF declared in November 2016 that Argentine statistics were again in accordance with international standards.

Among the most notorious vulnerabilities of the administration was an extremely high inflation rate: it was 40% in 2016 (while the Central Bank expected an inflation rate of 17% for 2017, 10% for 2018 and 5% for 2019).

Other vulnerabilities included the unemployment rate close to 9%, as well as the sharp rise in the current-account deficit, which is likely to be around 3% to 4% of GDP in 2018 thanks to an over-valued currency.

Between 2017 and 2018 the government cut import tariffs on capital goods and eliminated tariffs on the importation of technology products to encourage investment.

The deregulation area allowed the incorporation of low cost airlines, such as JetSmart, Norwegian and Flybondi.

Inflation continued to be a problem, with a rate of 25% in 2017, second only to Venezuela in South America and the highest rate in the G20. On December 28, the Central Bank of Argentina together with the Treasury announced a change of the inflation target. This was seen by the market as a relaxation of the monetary policy. They attempted to reduce it to 15%, but these efforts failed.

The international trade, which had a surplus in the previous year, gave a deficit. A drought reduced the production of soy, the country's principal export, ranking among the world's worst natural disasters in 2018.

The Federal Reserve of the United States increased interest rates from 0.25% to 1.75% and then 2%. This caused investors to return to the United States, leaving emerging markets. The effect, a raise in the price of the United States dollar, was modest in most countries, but it was felt particularly strongly in Argentina, Brazil and Turkey.

Those factors led to a monetary crisis. The interest rate increased to 60%, but could not keep the price of the US dollar.

Macri announced on May 8 that Argentina would seek a loan from the International Monetary Fund (IMF). The loan was $57bn, and the country pledged to reduce inflation and public spending.

For 2019, the government accelerated the austerity plans, with less expenses and more taxes, to completely remove the fiscal deficit.

The inflation rate was 53.8%, the highest in the country in 28 years.

Human rights
Human rights organizations had aligned themselves with the governments of both Néstor and Cristina Kirchner, even in topics unrelated to human rights, and often worked as their spokesmen. They continued this role after 2015, when Macri defeated the Kirchnerite candidate in the presidential elections, which undermined the legitimacy of the organizations in Argentine society. Macri maintained a distant relation with those organizations, and did not seek their support, but did not openly confront them. They kept their funding and the institutions under their control, and the trials of military personnel for crimes in the Dirty War (1974–1983) continued. Nevertheless, the organizations continued their opposition to Macri. His cabinet was divided on an approach to take: whether to directly confront the organizations and remove their state financing, or to take an active role in their activities and replace their leaders with less politically motivated figures. The general policy, however, was to ignore the disputes and focus the activities of the government towards more pressing matters, such as the economy.

The government modified the public holiday for the Day of Remembrance for Truth and Justice, which makes reference to the 1976 Argentine coup d'état, to allow it to be celebrated on a movable date. This ruling was met with huge criticism. The ruling was reverted some days later, and the holiday was kept at the fixed date of 24 March.

Social issues
The #NiUnaMenos movement, which advanced a feminist agenda in Argentina since 2015, stayed strong during the Macri presidency. Macri said during the 2018 opening of the National Congress that, although he was anti-abortion, he wanted the Congress to have an abortion debate and discuss a bill for a new abortion law. As of 2018, abortion was only legally allowed for rapes and cases that may threaten the mother's health. The feminist movement organized several demonstrations in the following months, in support of the voluntary termination of pregnancy abortion bill that was proposed in Congress. The proposal, however, became highly polarizing. The country has a strong conservative catholic population, particularly in the less-populated provinces, who rejected the bill.  This polarization was unrelated to the political polarization of the country, and the legislators of both Cambiemos and the Justicialist Party (PJ) were divided on the vote. The bill was approved by the chamber of deputies in June, but opposition became more organized after its approval and the Senate rejected the bill, by 38 to 31 votes.

Foreign affairs

During his government, Macri wants to strengthen ties with Brazil and the Southern Cone, looking away from the Bolivarian axis and claim for political prisoners in Venezuela. It will also promote the repeal of the agreement with Iran and work for a rapprochement with the United States and Europe. He has also worked to strengthen relations with Israel.

Americas 

After being elected President, Macri received many congratulations from other Latin American Presidents. Despite the ruling Workers' party having supported Daniel Scioli during the campaign, Brazilian President Dilma Rousseff congratulated Macri and invited him to a state visit "as soon as possible", while she was also set to attend Macri's inauguration as president. The pair have favored improving bilateral relations between the two countries, as well as strengthening the Mercosur trade bloc.

The Chilean President, Michelle Bachelet, contacted Macri by phone and spoke about the importance for both countries of maintaining the spirit of cooperation, integration and development which characterizes their common history and the importance of further work for Latin America.

Juan Manuel Santos expressed "Congratulations to Mauricio Macri for his victory in presidential elections in Argentina. Successes in his management. It has our full support".

The President of Ecuador, Rafael Correa, congratulated Macri for his victory and wished him "the best of luck".

The President of Mexico, Enrique Peña Nieto, stated that "Mexico will work with" Macri's government to strengthen "bilateral relations and the wellbeing of Latin America".

Peruvian President Ollanta Humala contacted Macri in order to congratulate him on his election victory and point out that the Peruvian Government has "strong will" to strengthen ties with his country, reported the Peruvian Foreign Ministry.

Uruguayan president Tabaré Vázquez greeted Macri by telephone and asked him to convey his congratulations to the people of Argentina for the civic maturity demonstrated during the election.

Immediately after the elections, Macri announced that he would ask for the invocation of Mercosur's "democratic clause" (limiting membership to democracies) with regard to Venezuela, since the government of Nicolás Maduro was not respecting democratic doctrines. He called for the holding of the 2015 Venezuelan elections without electoral fraud or tricks to avoid the result, and the release of political prisoners. In the end Maduro acknowledged the defeat of his party in the elections. Nevertheless, Macri made diplomatic requests for the political prisoners in the first meeting of Mercosur that he attended. Venezuela's opposition hailed Macri's presidential win in Argentina as a blow for leftists in Latin America and a good omen for their own duel with Chavismo in the next month's parliamentary vote. "That was a big disappointment for Venezuela's ruling socialist 'Chavismo' movement, which had a close political alliance with Fernández." Diosdado Cabello called Macri a "fascist", and asked him to stay away from Venezuelan internal affairs, as Macri had proposed to remove Venezuela from the Mercosur because of the treatment to Leopoldo López and other political prisoners. The victory of Macri is considered part of the decline of the Pink Tide in the region.

On November 5, Macri made his first trip as President-elect to Brazil, where he met with President Dilma Rousseff in Brasilia. Macri said he chose Brazil for his first trip as President-elect because it is the main commercial partner of Argentina and because of the strong ties that both countries have. That same day, Mauricio Macri traveled to Santiago de Chile, where he was received by President Michelle Bachelet in the Palacio de la Moneda.

United States 

The United States Secretary of State John Kerry congratulated the country for its "successful elections", adding that he was "looking forward to working closely" with Macri and his government. Meanwhile, United States Ambassador to Argentina Noah Mamet wished Macri well. Members of the United States House of Representatives later asked Barack Obama in a letter to prioritise US-Argentine relations during 2016, stating that "The United States and Argentina should be natural partners. Both have highly educated populations, diversified economies and vast natural resources" and calling such a relationship a "win-win" for both countries. The letter also stressed the importance of reversing high levels of anti-Americanism in the country and resolving the holdout problem with the vulture funds, among other key issues.

Obama later congratulated Macri personally, while an official White House statement confirmed that the President intends to strengthen ties. The relations between Argentina and the United States began to twitch due to the problem that came into the Argentine Government and the vulture fund, where former President Cristina Fernández de Kirchner stated after the latter denial of certiorari that her country had an obligation to pay its creditors, but not to become the victims of extortion by speculators; even if Argentina can't use the U.S. financial system to do so, she said, teams of experts are working on ways to avoid such a default and keep Argentina's promises. The expiration of Rights Upon Future Offers in December 2014 will preclude other bondholders from suing for better terms should the Argentine Government and the vulture funds settle, making such a settlement all the more likely after that date, should the dispute continue.

On February 18, 2016, a White House official announced that President Obama would undertake a state visit to Argentina on March 23–24, 2016 to improve the Argentina–United States relations after the two countries' relations under predecessors Cristina Fernández de Kirchner and Néstor Kirchner saw tension in trade and investment. President Obama and the First Family arrived in Buenos Aires Ministro Pistarini International Airport from Havana, Cuba at around 1 a.m. (UTC−3) on Wednesday, March 23, where they were greeted by Argentine Foreign Minister Susana Malcorra.

Obama and Macri discussed ways to strengthen cooperation in promoting "universal values and interests," such as in the areas of security, energy, health and human rights, where the two presidents have agreed for U.S. federal agencies to assist Argentina's counter-terrorism efforts, to contribute to peacekeeping missions, combat illegal drug trade and organized crime, respond to diseases and outbreaks like the Zika virus, and develop resources and renewable energy strategies. Obama also praised Macri for his economic reforms that helped create "sustainable and inclusive economic growth" and "reconnected Argentina with the world economy." Thus, Obama declared a "fresh era" of relations that would help Argentina's credibility in the Latin American region and the world, and announced trade and economic initiatives to reset the countries relations after years of tension.

On 24 March 2016, Foreign Minister Susana Malcorra announced that Argentina signed agreements with the United States to join again on the Visa Waiver Program. Argentina initially joined on the program in 1996, but was removed in 2002.

Foreign Minister Susana Malcorra supported Democrat Hillary Clinton in the 2016 US presidential election, which was won by Republican Donald Trump.

Macri forged diplomatic relations with Trump and brought in measures likened to Trump's border policies, including tightening control of immigration, limiting the entry of convicted criminals and facilitating the deportation of foreigners who commit crimes.

In 2019, Trump declassified more than 5,600 US documents about the Dirty War.

Europe 

Many European leaders publicly expressed support for the new government of Macri. German Chancellor Angela Merkel congratulated Macri and requested that he make a state visit to Germany. She added that the two countries have "always been deeply tied", particularly in the area of science, which she deemed "one of the pillars" of the two countries' relations. Merkel also remarked that she would be "thankful" if the countries could strengthen cooperation "in all areas". Spanish Prime Minister Mariano Rajoy, who has a close relationship with Macri, congratulated him and invited him to carry out a state visit "as soon as possible", stating that he is confident that the new government will "lead this new stage with success" while offering "the necessary support to consolidate the historical ties of friendship, fraternity and cooperation". The relationship between Spain and Argentina had become increasingly tense under the presidency of Cristina Kirchner, particularly after the Renationalization of YPF in 2012. In a telegram to Macri, Russian President Vladimir Putin expressed his hopes that the two countries will continue to increase the "bilateral cooperation within diverse areas and the coordination of efforts to resolve current occurrences within the international agenda", adding that "the fundamental interests of the people of Russia and Argentina contribute to guarantee the stability and security of Latin America and the world", while reminding Macri that the countries had recently celebrated 130 years of diplomatic relations. Putin also made reference to the ongoing nuclear power and hydrocarbon extraction projects between the countries. In February 2016, Macri received the President of Bulgaria, Rosen Plevneliev, at the Casa Rosada in Buenos Aires. Both leaders spoke of investments in each country; Plevneliev also met with entrepreneurs and visited the National Congress.

Italian Prime Minister Matteo Renzi called Macri on the night of his victory and stated that he would meet soon with the new president to "open a new page of collaboration between the two countries". He also highlighted the historical and cultural ties between the two countries, stating that "it is the country with the largest presence of Italian citizens in the world", numbering some 900,000. The Cambiemos victory also provoked much reaction in the domestic Italian press. On 15 February 2016, Renzi met with Macri for a two-day state visit to Buenos Aires; Renzi was the first European leader to meet Macri after the 2015 presidential election and the first Italian Prime Minister since Romano Prodi in 1998 to visit Argentina.

French President François Hollande sent a telegram to Macri and expressed "We will have the opportunity at that time to deepen our dialogue and our bilateral relationship that is one of the densest known to the Latin American continent". Hollande also confirmed a state visit to Argentina in February 2016. Upon congratulating President Macri on his victory in the 2015 election, President Hollande announced that he would visit Argentina in February 2016. During his state visit to Buenos Aires on 24–25 February 2016, Macri and Hollande signed 20 bilateral agreements.

British Prime Minister David Cameron called Macri after his election to congratulate him and offer his support for his presidency. A Downing Street spokesperson stated that "both leaders expect to meet in the near future", emphasising trade relations and investments, while also prioritising the establishment of a free trade agreement between MERCOSUR and the European Union "as soon as possible". The chancellor Susana Malcorra clarified that Argentina would maintain the Argentine claim in the Falkland Islands sovereignty dispute, but would also try to expand the Argentina–United Kingdom relations into other areas of interest. Macri met Cameron at the World Economic Forum in Davos, Switzerland, to which Argentina officially returned after 12 years. After the meeting, Macri said he had a "very nice meeting" with Cameron and explained in a brief meeting with journalists that their goal is to initiate "a relationship in which all issues on the table are placed under one umbrella". Chancellor Malcorra reported that the dispute over the sovereignty of the Falkland Islands was one of the most important axes of the meeting, but not the only one. "Focusing our relationship only in the Islands is to stay with the glass half full," said the minister.

In July 2016, President Macri started a European tour that took him to France, Belgium and Germany, where he sought to project his international leadership as a political and commercial partner of the European Union. Macri held in Paris a meeting with French President Francois Hollande, and Berlin with German Chancellor Angela Merkel, in this case in the context of a two-day official visit in which the President was accompanied by businessmen. In addition to meeting with the two leaders brunt of the European Union, Macri was received in Brussels by the European Council President Donald Tusk, the High Representative of the European Union for Foreign Affairs, Federica Mogherini, and by King Philip and Queen Mathilde at the Royal Palace of Brussels.

Asia 

On March 27, 2016, a Casa Rosada official announced that President Macri will meet with Chinese president Xi Jinping on 1 April in the framework of the 2016 Nuclear Security Summit in Washington D.C. China and Argentina established diplomatic relations in 1972 but revived especially during the mandates of Nestor Kirchner and Cristina Kirchner, during which relations reached the level of "Comprehensive Strategic Partnership". However, since the assumption of Macri, the relationship was observed for the promises of the now head of state during the election campaign to "review" the proceedings between the Casa Rosada and Beijing between 2003 and 2015. Both countries signed agreements in 2015 for the construction of two new nuclear power plants in Argentina, with a total investment of 15,000 million dollars in an operation in which China pledged 85 percent of funding. China is the second main destination of Argentine exports after Brazil.

During the 2016 Nuclear Security Summit Macri also met with Japanese prime minister Shinzo Abe, Indian prime minister Narendra Modi and South Korean president Park Geun-hye with the aim to resume relations and try to add investors in Argentina. Japan and South Korea have a strong interest in investing in the areas of mining, energy, and infrastructure, and to raise levels of trade with Argentina. It is also known that there is a strong interest of Japanese and Korean companies to invest in the lithium deposits of the Argentine Northwest.

In September 2016, during the G20 summit in Hangzhou, China, President Macri met with Indian prime minister Narendra Modi and they made a commitment to expand the relations between Argentina and India. "I think so far the relationship between our countries has been a little superficial. It's a good opportunity to deepen" Macri said. Macri met Modi in one of the last added to its agenda of activities at the G20 summit bilateral meetings. Macri expressed interest to "increase and diversify" Argentine exports to India and for Indian companies to "come to invest in our country." Modi also expressed satisfaction that the Confederation of Indian Industry will participate in the Business Forum in the city of Buenos Aires. In addition, the Argentine president exchanged a greeting with Indonesian president Joko Widodo. In both meetings Macri was accompanied by Foreign Minister Susana Malcorra, Economy Minister Alfonso Prat-Gay, and Secretary of Strategic Affairs Fulvio Pompeo.

In November 2016, President Macri received Japanese prime minister Shinzo Abe in the Casa Rosada of Buenos Aires to give a new impetus to the economic and commercial relations between both nations. Abe's state visit to Argentina was the first of a Japanese leader in 57 years. Macri and Abe signed several bilateral instruments, including a Memorandum of Cooperation for the establishment of an enhanced mechanism for political consultations. The last precedent was in 1959, when Nobusuke Kishi, Abe's grandfather, arrived to hold a bilateral meeting with the then President Arturo Frondizi.

Middle East 

On December 21, government lawyers withdrew an appeal in Federal Court made by his predecessor, over the constitutionality of a memorandum she had signed with the Iranian government, to investigate the 1994 AMIA bombing. The memorandum was criticized by both Israel and Argentina's Jewish community, as Iran was long suspected of being involved in the attack. The memorandum had been ruled unconstitutional by a federal court during Kirchner's administration, and along with the withdrawal of the appeal, the memorandum was voided by Macri's administration. The move was praised by Israeli Prime Minister Benjamin Netanyahu as an improvement of bilateral relations.

In July 2016 President Macri met with the Emir of Qatar, Tamim bin Hamad Al Thani, at the Presidential Residence of Olivos. Both led the signing of memorandums of understanding signed Chancellor, Susana Malcorra, and his Qatari counterpart, Mohammed bin Abdulrahman bin Jassim Al-Thani. also they attended by the Chief of Staff, Marcos Peña, and the Minister of Finance and Public Finance, Alfonso Prat-Gay. In 2015, Argentina exported to Qatar goods by 11.5 million dollars and imported worth just over 153 million dollars, what, 141 million deficit in bilateral balance totaled 164 million, down 35 percent in relation to 2014, when the exchange was 471.5 million dollars, according to statistics from the Inter-American Development Bank (IDB).

In July 2016, it was announced that Argentina would grant asylum to 3,000 refugees of the Syrian Civil War.

Criticism

Conflict over the presidential inauguration protocol 

On November 24, two days after the ballot, outgoing president Cristina Fernández de Kirchner and president-elect Macri met and agreed on the transfer protocol to be carried out on December 10 at the National Congress. Macri himself was in charge of announcing what was agreed at the meeting, which he described as a protocol and "cordial":

Subsequently, he changed his mind and considered that the oath had to be made in the National Congress, but after the oath, both had to move to the Casa Rosada so that Fernández de Kirchner there gave him the band and the cane. He explained that he intended to preserve the tradition prior to 2003, while Cristina's spokesmen explained that the agreement should be fulfilled according to what the Constitution establishes. The underlying reasons for Macri's change of opinion have led to journalistic speculation, as well as the alleged intentions of both to humiliate the other or the other.

While the negotiations were in progress, he made a judicial presentation requesting that it be established that President Cristina Fernández de Kirchner's mandate would end on December 9 at midnight. 198

The presentation of the judicial claim definitively interrupted the negotiations. Known the decision of the prosecutor to make room for the claim of Macri, the head of the Federal Intelligence Agency Oscar Parrilli questioned by irregular judicial decision to shorten the constitutional mandate of Kirchner, leave the country without president and force to put into operation the law of acefalía, supporting before an affirmation of a journalist that "if there is acefalía as you say that for me it is a blow". Parrilli announced that because the justice system had established that the presidential mandate of Cristina Kirchner had ended the day before the inauguration of the new president took place, it did not legally correspond to be present in the National Congress. 199

The next day Judge Maria Servini de Cubria made the injunction requested by Macri and ordered that the mandate of President Kirchner should end at midnight on December 9, twelve hours before the ceremony of transfer of command and swear in Congress. The judicial decision generated an anomalous situation, since the mandate of President Kirchner would end before Macri could comply with the constitutional requirements to assume command.

Faced with this situation, the provisional president of the Senate, Federico Pinedo, announced that he would be president of the Nation starting at 00:01 on December 10, holding office until Macri takes the constitutional oath. 200

Simultaneously the block of deputies of the Front for Victory declared that the judicial decision constituted a "subjugation to the institutions" and that it would not attend the act of assumption as president of Mauricio Macri. 201

Pinedo effectively assumed the exercise to the Executive Power to cease the mandate of Cristina Kirchner, applying to the case the law of acefalía. 202

Conflict with the Public Ministry 
After being elected President of the Nation, Macri confirmed that he intended the Attorney General of the Nation Alejandra Gils Carbó, head of the Public Prosecutor's Office to resign, despite the fact that it is a civil servant and a constitutional body that are independent of the Executive Power. for which he was chosen. 203

Attorney General Gils Carbó considered that President Macri did not have legal powers to demand his resignation and that it was a violation of institutionality and constitutional order. 204 The Attorney General received the support of more than 80 prosecutors and judicial officials. 205 Some 120 prosecutors from the Public Prosecutor's Office expressed their support for the Attorney General, Alejandra Gils Carbó, by noting "her deep concern" for the demonstrations carried out by different political actors "during the electoral campaign" and that they exercise "undue pressure "on the official by demanding her resignation. 206

In that context, Attorney General Gils Carbó was not invited to the presidential oath, because the invitation was sent to an incorrect address. Several human rights organizations, such as the Mothers of Plaza de Mayo and Nobel Peace Prize winner Adolfo Pérez Esquivel, considered that President Macri was unduly putting pressure on the Prosecutor's Office, and declared their solidarity in support of the Attorney General's continuity. 207

Conflict over the appointment by decree of two members of the Supreme Court 
On 14 December 2015 the Executive Power reported that Macri appointed by decree of necessity and urgency , without approval of the Senate , two judges on commission for vacant positions in the Supreme Court of Argentina . 208 According to article 99 of the National Constitution , the Executive Power " appoints the magistrates of the Supreme Court with the agreement of the Senate by two thirds of its members present, in public session, summoned for that purpose. " 209 The press release justifies this designation without agreement based on paragraph 19 of the same article: 208" 19. You can fill the vacancies of the jobs, which require the agreement of the Senate, and that occur during your recess, by means of commission appointments that will expire at the end of the next Legislature. [...] " 209 In addition, Decree 222/03 establishes a prior system of challenges and public hearings to be able to appoint the members of the Supreme Court.

The president of the Supreme Court, Ricardo Lorenzetti , gave the "welcome" to the judges. 210 Lorenzetti affirmed, referring to the previous governments, Peronists:

The radical Ernesto Sanz said that Macri did what he had to do, and that the measure would guarantee good governance. 212 The journalist Adrián Ventura opined that "the procedure can be risky, strange, politically criticized by the opposition, but it is valid". 213

Months later, Mauricio Macri sent the Senate a list of ten judges for the Supreme Court, which included the lawyer of the Clarín Group, the former personal lawyer of Macri charged in the Correo Argentino scandal, together with militant and radical militants, Macri also requested that they name cojueza of the court to the daughter of the magistrate that has in its hands the Argentine Mail cause, by which is imputed by condoning to a familiar company 70,000 million weights of debt, who in turn works with the minister Garavano, to the lawyer of the vice-president Gabriela Michetti in the scandal by the bags of money in his house, and an ex- judge who summoned to timbreos in favor of Macri, among others. 214

Objections to the Decree 
The measure was criticized by politicians, jurists and journalists of the majority of the political arc, including several important figures of Cambiemos, criticizing from the little republican to directly by calling it unconstitutional. 215 Among the main criticisms, former presidential candidate Margarita Stolbizer described the decision as "inadmissible" and "an institutional setback"; 216 also ex-candidate Sergio Massa maintained that "the names are impeccable, the form horrible"; 217 Senator Miguel Ángel Pichetto maintained that it was "nonsense"; 218 the jurist León Arslaniánhe considered it "improper"; the journalist of Joaquín Morales Solá declared that "it does not seem convenient, nor opportune nor a success"; 219 the ex-governor of the province of Córdoba José Manuel de la Sota reproached him that the construction of a republic "will not be achieved by appointing provisional judges of the Court by decree." 220 Former Supreme Court Minister Eugenio Zaffaroni questioned the decision saying that "this affects the Republic and democracy without a republic can be a chaos, it seems an outrage, it is an abuse of authority." 221 The journalist Mario WainfeldHe maintained that "the move passes over the Senate to the top" and that Macri's intention is "to partially format a court to his liking". 222 The constitutionalist Daniel Sabsaydescribed the measure as "of terror", "manifest unconstitutionality" and "phenomenal regression", maintaining that he was "setting a disastrous precedent for the Argentine institutions he promised to improve" and contrasting President Macri's attitude with the one of the president Néstor Kirchner that autolimited his faculty to designate the members of the Court by means of the Decree Nº 222/03. 223 The president of the Bar Association of Buenos Aires Raúl Rizzo expressed his disagreement saying "we started bad Mauricio. " 224The Nobel Peace Prize winner Adolfo Perez Esquivel said that "is an unprecedented extent authoritarian democracy". 225 The radical senator from Cambiemos Julio Cobos affirmed that the appointment of the judges of the Court by Decree of necessity and urgency "has surprised me and is unnecessary", maintaining that he does not see "reasons for it to be by decree and not by sending Senate". 226 The lawyer of Cambiemos Gil Lavedra described the measure as a "very unfortunate precedent", adding that "the constitutional norm that was used is untenable in view of the scope of the principle of independence of judges."227 Ricardo Alfonsínde Cambiemos, also criticized the decree because "leaves much to be desired in terms of republican and political legitimacy." 227 The socialist governor of Santa Fe called it "an error". 228

Beatriz Sarlo said that Macri had met a few days ago with the main opposition figures to seek basic consensus and did not mention that he was preparing an appointment of two judges of the Court by decree and in committee:

On the other hand, the ex-candidate for the Progressive Front Margarita Stolbizer and the former candidate for the renovating Peronism Sergio Massa, made a joint declaration asking President Macri to reconsider his decision to appoint the members of the Court by decree. 230

Objections to candidates 
About the appointed members of the Court, the press has released information about them. In the case of Carlos Rosenkrantz, the journalist Luis Bruchtein has announced that he was a lawyer for Grupo Clarín in his actions against the Law on Audiovisual Communication Services . 231 Page / 12 in turn said Rosenkrantz in 2007, published a questioning of the Supreme Court rulings handed down in the case "Simon" and "Mazaeus" through article which declared unconstitutional the laws of endpoint, due obedience and the pardons of Menem to thecrimes against humanity . 232

The Coordinator against Police and Institutional Repression (Correpi) questioned the merits of the "appointed" candidates. 233 With regard to Rosatti, he announced that while he was in charge of the government secretariat of the Province of Santa Fe and in the municipality, more than 80 people died at the hands of the security forces he controlled and that in 2005 He was accused of pressuring the National Anti-Corruption Office to file an investigation against his former boss, Carlos Reutemann, about the misappropriation of public funds due to the 2003 flood, which caused dozens of deaths. 233 With respect to Carlos Fernando RosenkrantzHe questioned his links with companies that include major media ( América TV, La Nación, Grupo Clarín and Cablevisión ), food sales chains, prepaid medicine, telecommunications, energy, "and a huge etcetera of the world of business and finance" . 233

Conflict with workers of Cresta Roja 
On December 22, the National Gendarmerie repressed a demonstration by employees of a poultry industry that had cut the Ricchieri Highway, access to the Ezeiza International Airport, after ordering the protesters to leave the court within five minutes. The repression, which consisted of two separate charges for a few hours, included the use of sticks, rubber bullets and hydrant trucks, leaving between ten and twelve workers injured, according to the testimony of the demonstrators. 234 235Cristian Villalba, delegate of the workers, denounced that the aggressions were not initiated by the workers of Cresta Roja but by political activists infiltrated in the demonstration. 236 This situation provoked a dispute between the government and the Partido Obrero, since the Ministry of Security, led by Patricia Bullrich, directly incriminated this political organization trying to occupy the Ezeiza airport and unleash the conflict. 237 What was worth a criminal complaint against the official by the left organization "for slander and insults, aggravated because they come from high-ranking State officials and, therefore, to use lies to pave political persecution."238 The day after this presentation, the ministry retracted 239 and the lawsuit was withdrawn.

Conflict with the AFSCA 
Macri said he intended the resignation of Martin Sabbatella, president of the Federal Audiovisual Communication Services Authority, a self-governing body that had the responsibility of regulating audiovisual media and was created by the Media Law . By law, the mandate of the AFSCA president was four years "there must be two years of difference between the beginning of the mandate of the directors and the national Executive Power". 240

On the second day of his mandate, Macri signed a Decree of Necessity and Urgency (DNU) stating that AFSCA and AFTIC would become dependent on the Ministry of Communication. 241 Several organizations and unions reported that the creation of the new portfolio seeks to eliminate the AFSCA's self-sufficiency, constituting a covert intervention and called for a symbolic embrace in defense of the AFSCA and the preservation of its autonomy. 242

On December 11, Communications Minister Oscar Aguad announced that "the regulation of the Media Law will not subsist during our government." 243 Minister Aguad's announcement was in turn questioned by AFSCA president Martín Sabbatella, denouncing that the government intends to benefit Grupo Clarín . 244

On the afternoon of December 14, a group of members of social and political organizations, workers and self-convened held a demonstration in the Plaza de Mayo in defense of the AFSCA and the Media Law, becoming the first opposition march to the government of Macri. There were also demonstrations in the cities of Córdoba and Mendoza . 245

On December 23 Macri arranged to intervene the Federal Audiovisual Communication Services Authority (AFSCA). Communications Minister Oscar Aguad justified the measure by saying that the authorities of the AFSCA had committed an act of " rebellion " and that its president Martin Sabbatella was a " political activist ." 246 Sabatella with a mandate until 2017, affirmed that the "government was democratically elected but has the attitudes of a de facto government " and filed an amparo and habeas corpus appeal before the courts . 247A few hours after the intervention a demonstration of citizens met to protest against the measure at the door of the AFSCA. 248 The Ministry of Communications placed Agustín Garzón as auditor of the AFSCA. 249 Later Garzón was accused of political persecution and arbitrary dismissals in the organization, and of intimidation, 250 besides using police officers to intimidate employees. 251 He was also criticized for designating Cambiemos militants in the public body . 252

Scandal of Panama Papers 
Macri is among the politicians involved in the international investigation into corruption through tax havens called " Panama Papers ", published on April 3, 2016, by the International Consortium of Investigative Journalists . 253 According to the investigation, he joined with his father Franco and his brother Mariano the board of the offshore company Fleg Trading Ltd, registered in the Bahamas between 1998 and 2009. When he was elected mayor of Buenos Aires in 2007, the now president did not include in his sworn statements his connection to the firm. 254 255Macri's official spokesman, Ivan Pavlovsky, said the Argentine president did not declare his participation in that offshore company as an asset because he had no equity interest in it. 253 Journalist Joaquín Morales Solá considers it unlikely that the case will be prosecuted, since Mauricio Macri appears personally in the company's board of directors (and not using a front man ), Franco Macri declared the account before AFIP, the money movement was insignificant, and was closed a year after Mauricio Macri was elected head of government. 256On April 7, a few days after the scandal was known, Mauricio Macri was formally imputed by the prosecutor Federico Delgado. 257 Judge Sebastián Casanello is in charge of investigating the case, and he asked the Central Bank to report on all the accounts that have Macri as owner or agent. He also asked the AFIP for affidavits from the father and brothers of the President and sent letters to five countries. 258

Months later, the existence of another company was known, -Kagemusha SA, based in Panama-, in which President Macri was vice president and director. 259

In September 2017 the judge in charge of the case ruled that Mauricio Macri "was not a partner or shareholder" of any of the two companies, which had been created by his father Franco Macri, who was responsible for both firms. 260 Subsequent investigations, released in June 2018, show a series of steps taken by legal representatives of Mauricio Macri, in order to obtain the documents that dissociated him from the case, including a document with an adulterated date that he adjudicates the total responsibility of Fleg Trading to his father Franco Macri. 261

Scandal by filtering and alteration of data in the AFIP 
See also: Scandal by filtering and alteration of data in the AFIP

During the first year of the government, a scandal broke out over the alteration and filtering of secret AFIP information for political purposes . The investigation involves a group of officials of the AFIP, accused of "filtering" confidential information on taxpayers, with political objectives. In turn, it was reported that tests are being erased in AFIP involving politicians from the Change Alliance. 262 The prosecutor Eduardo Taiano denounced the preparation of "dossiers" of influential personalities that were later used in judicial cases or broadcast in the media. 263Inclusively, the case asks to investigate whether the head of the entity Alberto Abad and the general deputy director of Impositive Operations in the Interior, Jaime Mecicovsky helped the company IECSA, -owned by Ángelo Calcaterra, the cousin of President Mauricio Macri-, to "readjust" to a possible "fraudulent fiscal insolvency." 264

According to the investigation, since Cambiemos they would have used sensitive information from government rivals and protected by fiscal secrecy to prepare reports that were then leaked to Carrió in order to make journalistic reports. Thus, sworn statements, bank transactions, credit card expenses, among others, were under the possibility of being disclosed, 264 which were used for the electoral campaign of Mauricio Macri, through a special force within AFIP to collect data of his «enemies». 265

The prosecutor Eduardo Taiano imputed the head of the AFIP, appointed by Mauricio Macri for the crime of violation of secrecy along with the ally of Cambiemos, Elisa Carrió. 266

Ghost contributors to the 2015 campaign 
In 2016 certain journalistic investigations revealed cases of irregularities in the financing of the presidential campaign of Mauricio Macri and Gabriela Michetti, -as well as the campaign of the opposition candidate Kirchner, Daniel Scioli-, 267 complaints about contractor companies that were contributors, donors " ghosts "or without economic capacity and contractors of the Government of the City that added millions for the presidential campaign of Mauricio Macri. 268 In addition, the Cambiemos alliance designated two retirees as the maximum responsible for handling the 36 million pesos that it used in the PASO. 269According to La Nación, Stella Maris Sandoval, 68, was the legal manager of those funds although she denied the newspaper having occupied that position as well as being a member of the PRO. "I never signed anything," he confessed. Another retiree, María Armanda Inza, 82, also assured La Nación that she was not aware of it. 270 271

Rates of public services 
On April 5, 2016, cacerolazos occurred in Argentina, protesters demanded the resignation of Mauricio Macri after the large number of dismissals, the steep increases, adjustments, tariffs and the link and imputation for the Panama Papers case . There were cacerolazos in the center of Mar del Plata, in the plaza in front of the Cathedral, also a massive mobilization called # 7A in repudiation of Macri's adjustment and corruption. 272 There were also protests in other plazas in the interior of the country and in Rosario. 273 Spontaneously summoned to the cry of "processed", thousands of demonstrators gathered in Plaza de Mayo in the city of Buenos Aires. 272 274

Market crisis 
At the end of August 2018, there was a rise in the dollar standing at a maximum of 40 pesos in exchange houses, this situation has been developing a distrust and dissatisfaction by various sectors of society towards the government. 275 After this happened, Macri reduced his ministerial cabinet. 276

Controversy by nickname 
Painted "Macri cat".
On May 17, 2016, President Macri visited the city of Ledesma in Jujuy, to inaugurate "the thousandth house", as had been announced, in the midst of a climate of hostility and division where the deputy of Parlasur, Milagro Sala, She had been detained for months. That day Luis Llanos, a young native of the capital of the province, publicly rebuked the president under the label of "Macri Gato". This fact earned Llanos the arrest by the provincial police and generated a viralization of the nickname throughout the country. 277

In the prison jargon "cat" derives from "gatillar", in the sense of paying, and refers to the prisoner who collects for the head of the pavilion: "The" cat "above all things, despises the one who is inferior to conditions and admires who uses it. " 278

In 2018, the announcer Mario Pergolini considered that the expression "Macri gato" is "a great graffiti" that adequately expresses the feeling of youth that must be contestative. 279

References

 
2016 in Argentina
2017 in Argentina
2018 in Argentina
2019 in Argentina
Macri
2015 establishments in Argentina